Aaron Sims Creative is a studio in Los Angeles, California that creates visual effects for film, television and gaming. Founded in 2005 by Aaron Sims, it provides a variety of services including concept design and development, 3D printing, previs and real-time VFX, augmented and virtual reality, and video game development.

Background
Aaron Sims began his career as a special effects artist under Rick Baker and Stan Winston, where he helped develop visual-effects techniques that had a significant influence on character and concept design for film and television. In 2005, he founded Aaron Sims Creative to create and realize characters, creatures and environments for all entertainment platforms.

Feature film projects

 Skinwalkers (2006)
 The Hills Have Eyes II (2007)
 Dead Silence (2007)
 Hairspray (2007)
 30 Days of Night (2007)
 Fred Claus (2007)
 The Mist (2007)
 The Golden Compass (2007)
 I Am Legend (2007)
 One Missed Call (2008)
 The Chronicles of Narnia: Prince Caspian (2008)
 The Incredible Hulk (2008)
 The Mummy: Tomb of the Dragon Emperor (2008)
 The Day the Earth Stood Still (2008)
 The Spirit (2008)
 Blood Creek (2009)
 The Unborn (2009)
 Blood: The Last Vampire (2009)
 X-Men Origins: Wolverine (2009)
 Cirque du Freak: The Vampire's Assistant (2009)
 Percy Jackson & the Olympians: The Lightning Thief (2010)
 Clash of the Titans (2010)
 Insidious (2010)
 Sucker Punch (2011)
 Hop (2011)
 X-Men: First Class (2011)
 Green Lantern (2011)
 Transformers: Dark of the Moon (2011)
 Rise of the Planet of the Apes (2011)
 The Thing (2011)
Rites of Spring (2011)
 The Twilight Saga: Breaking Dawn Part 1 (2011)
 Wrath of the Titans (2012)
 The Apparition (2012)
 The Amazing Spider-Man (2012)
 Abraham Lincoln: Vampire Hunter (2012)
 The Twilight Saga: Breaking Dawn Part 2 (2012)
 G.I. Joe: Retaliation (2013)
 300: Rise of an Empire (2014)
 I, Frankenstein (2014)
 Lights Out (2016)

Television 
 The River
 Falling Skies

Video games 
 Prototype
 Command & Conquer 3: Tiberium Wars
 Untold Legends: Dark Kingdom
 Infamous 2

Commercial campaigns 
 DirecTV
 Mercedes-Benz
 McDonald's
 Budweiser
 Toyota
 Jose Cuervo
 Gillette
 Energizer
 Verizon Wireless
 Autotrader
 DHL

References

External links

Computer companies established in 2005
Visual effects companies
American companies established in 2005